Erik Karl-Fredrik Stenman (born 2 June 1983) is a Swedish former professional footballer who played as a defender. Starting off his career in the early 2000s with Västerås SK, he went on to play professionally in Sweden, Germany, the Netherlands, and Belgium before ending his professional career with Djurgårdens IF in 2015. A full international between 2006 and 2011, he won three caps for the Sweden national team and was a squad member for Sweden at the 2006 FIFA World Cup.

Club career
Stenman was born in Munktorp, and began his professional career with Västerås SK in 1999. He would go on to make his Allsvenskan debut for IF Elfsborg in 2002, and then signed for Djurgårdens IF in the summer of 2003. While at Djurgården, he helped the team win the 2003 and 2005 Allsvenskan, as well as the 2004 and 2005 Svenska Cupen.

On 1 January 2006, Stenman joined the Bundesliga club Bayer Leverkusen for a transfer fee of 8 million SEK, and played in 28 Bundesliga games before leaving Germany to sign for the Eredivisie club FC Groningen in the summer of 2007. In the summer of 2011, he signed for Club Brugge in the Belgian First Division A, and played in 20 games until 2014 when he returned to Djurgårdens IF for a second stint. Stenman struggled for playing time at Djurgården and ended his professional career in 2015 to play for the Division 3 Östra Svealand team IFK Lidingö. In 2019, Stenman made a brief comeback and represented the club in a game in Division 2 Norra Svealand.

International career
Stenman won three caps for the Sweden national team between 2006 and 2011. He was named in the Sweden squad for the 2006 FIFA World Cup and served as a back-up left back behind Erik Edman.

Career statistics

International

Honours
Djurgårdens IF
Allsvenskan: 2003, 2005
Svenska Cupen: 2004, 2005

IFK Lidingö
 Division 3 Östra Svealand: 2016

References

External links
 
 

1983 births
Living people
People from Köping Municipality
Association football defenders
Swedish footballers
Västerås SK Fotboll players
IF Elfsborg players
Djurgårdens IF Fotboll players
Bayer 04 Leverkusen players
FC Groningen players
Club Brugge KV players
IFK Lidingö players
Allsvenskan players
Division 3 (Swedish football) players
Bundesliga players
Eredivisie players
Belgian Pro League players
Sweden international footballers
Sweden youth international footballers
Sweden under-21 international footballers
2006 FIFA World Cup players
Swedish expatriate footballers
Expatriate footballers in Germany
Swedish expatriate sportspeople in Germany
Expatriate footballers in the Netherlands
Swedish expatriate sportspeople in the Netherlands
Expatriate footballers in Belgium
Swedish expatriate sportspeople in Belgium
Sportspeople from Västmanland County